Wynnella auricula is a species of fungus in the family Helvellaceae, and the type species of genus Wynnella. It was first described in 1763 by German mycologist Jacob Christian Schäffer as Peziza auricula. Jean Louis Émile Boudier transferred it to Wynnella in 1885.

References

External links

Pezizales
Fungi of Europe
Fungi described in 1763
Taxa named by Jacob Christian Schäffer